Junya Kodo    (born March 24, 1983) is a Japanese mixed martial artist currently fighting in the Flyweight division of Shooto organization. Kodo is also the head coach and representative of Shooto Gym Kobe. KODO replaced Norifumi Yamamoto in 2 days notice to fight Joseph Benavidez on DREAM 5 Lightweight GP Final 2008.

KODO was ranked 3 in Japan Amateur Shooto Championships then going on to be Kansai Amateur Shooto Champion securing his rank as a professional A-Class Shooter.

Early career
Kodo started his career in early 2006, facing Tomohiko Yoshida at Powergate 6 on March 5, 2006. After three hard fought rounds, Kodo would win the fight via split decision. Kodo would fight against lower-tier opponents in Shooto, compiling a professional record of 6–1–2, before signing with Dream.

Dream
In his debut fight with Dream, Kodo faced current UFC fighter Joseph Benavidez at the Dream 5: Lightweight Grand Prix 2006 Finals on July 21, 2008. Benavidez, who was relatively unknown at the time, defeated Kodo via first round guillotine choke. Kodo subsequently re-signed with Shooto shortly after the fight.

Vale Tudo Japan
Following a long stint with Shooto, Kodo made his VTJ debut on June 28, 2014, facing Hidenobu Izena at VTJ 5th in Osaka. He won the fight via third round guillotine choke.

Mixed martial arts record

|-
| Loss
| align=center| 10–7–2
| Sota Kojima
| Submission (rear-naked choke)
| Tribe Tokyo Fight: TTF Challenge 03
| 
| align=center| 2
| align=center| 3:33
| Tokyo, Japan
|
|-
| Win
| align=center| 10–6–2
| Hidenobu Izena
| Submission (guillotine choke)
| Vale Tudo Japan: VTJ 5th in Osaka
| 
| align=center| 3
| align=center| 1:25
| Osaka, Japan
| 
|-
| Loss
| align=center| 9–6–2
| Masaaki Sugawara
| Submission (rear-naked choke)
| Shooto Border: Season 4 - 3rd
| 
| align=center| 3
| align=center| 3:43
| Osaka, Japan
| 
|-
| Win
| align=center| 9–5–2
| Shinichi Hanawa
| Decision (unanimous)
| Shooto: Gig Tokyo 10
| 
| align=center| 3
| align=center| 5:00
| Tokyo, Japan
| 
|-
| Loss
| align=center| 8–5–2
| Fumihiro Kitahara
| Submission (rear-naked choke)
| Shooto: Gig North 7
| 
| align=center| 2
| align=center| 3:57
| Sapporo, Japan
| 
|-
| Loss
| align=center| 8–4–2
| Kiyotaka Shimizu
| Submission (rear-naked choke)
| Shooto: Shootor's Legacy 2
| 
| align=center| 2
| align=center| 3:16
| Tokyo, Japan
| 
|-
| Win
| align=center| 8–3–2
| Kentaro Watanabe
| Decision (unanimous)
| Shooto: Border: Season 2: Rhythm
| 
| align=center| 3
| align=center| 5:00
| Osaka, Japan
| 
|-
| Loss
| align=center| 7–3–2
| Yuki Shojo
| Decision (majority)
| Shooto: Revolutionary Exchanges 2
| 
| align=center| 3
| align=center| 5:00
| Tokyo, Japan
| 
|-
| Win
| align=center| 7–2–2
| Takahiro Hosoi
| KO (punches)
| Shooto: Shooto Tradition 5
| 
| align=center| 2
| align=center| 0:36
| Tokyo, Japan
| 
|-
| Loss
| align=center| 6–2–2
| Joseph Benavidez
| Submission (guillotine choke)
| Dream 5: Lightweight Grand Prix 2008 Final Round
| 
| align=center| 1
| align=center| 2:42
| Osaka, Japan
| 
|-
| Loss
| align=center| 6–1–2
| So Tazawa
| Decision (unanimous)
| Shooto: Shooting Disco 5: Earth, Wind and Fighter
| 
| align=center| 3
| align=center| 5:00
| Tokyo, Japan
| 
|-
| Win
| align=center| 6–0–2
| Akira Kibe
| KO (punches)
| Shooto: Gig West 9
| 
| align=center| 1
| align=center| 1:38
| Osaka, Japan
| 
|-
| Draw
| align=center| 5–0–2
| Yasuhiro Kanayama
| Draw
| Shooto: Gig West 8
| 
| align=center| 2
| align=center| 5:00
| Osaka, Japan
| 
|-
| Draw
| align=center| 5–0–1
| Seiji Ozuka
| Draw
| Shooto: Battle Mix Tokyo 4
| 
| align=center| 2
| align=center| 5:00
| Tokyo, Japan
| 
|-
| Win
| align=center| 5–0
| Atsushi Osano
| TKO (doctor stoppage)
| Shooto: Battle Mix Tokyo 3
| 
| align=center| 2
| align=center| 3:21
| Tokyo, Japan
| 
|-
| Win
| align=center| 4–0
| Yasuaki Nagamoto
| Decision (majority)
| Shooto: Gig West 7
| 
| align=center| 2
| align=center| 5:00
| Osaka, Japan
| 
|-
| Win
| align=center| 3–0
| Manabu Kano
| Decision (unanimous)
| Shooto: Gig West 6
| 
| align=center| 2
| align=center| 5:00
| Osaka, Japan
| 
|-
| Win
| align=center| 2–0
| Yosuke Moriga
| Submission (rear-naked choke)
| Powergate 9: Kakuto Revival Festival
| 
| align=center| 3
| align=center| 2:31
| Kobe, Japan
| 
|-
| Win
| align=center| 1–0
| Tomohiko Yoshida
| Decision (split)
| Powergate 6: Tour in Shushinkan Breweries Hall
| 
| align=center| 3
| align=center| 3:00
| Kobe, Japan
|

References

External links
 Shooto Gym Kobe (Japanese)
 DREAM Fighter Profile
 Shooto Fighter Profile
 KODO's Blog

Flyweight mixed martial artists
Japanese male mixed martial artists
Mixed martial artists utilizing wrestling
Mixed martial artists utilizing judo
Japanese male judoka
Living people
People from Fukui Prefecture
Sportspeople from Fukui Prefecture
1983 births